Prentice Alvin (1989) is an alternate history/fantasy novel by American writer Orson Scott Card. It is the third book in Card's The Tales of Alvin Maker series and is about Alvin Miller, the seventh son of a seventh son. Prentice Alvin won the Locus Award for Best Fantasy Novel in 1990, was nominated for the Nebula Award for Best Novel in 1989, and the Hugo Award for Best Novel in 1990.

Plot summary
After being released from his time with Ta-Kumsaw, an Indian leader who taught Alvin the ways of Indian people, the young boy sets out to start his apprenticeship as a Smith in the town where he was born.

While there he meets a young half-black boy by the name of Arthur Stuart, the son of a slave and a slave-owner who has been adopted by the owners of the local guesthouse.

Another new friend comes in the form of Miss Margaret Larner, who he later discovers to be the "torch" who helped him to be born so many years ago, and with whom he has been strangely linked since that day.

Eventually, Alvin is forced into helping Arthur to escape some slave-hunters, something that requires him to slightly change Arthur's DNA enough to prevent the hunters' knacks from identifying the runaway child.
Alvin also creates a plow of living gold, which is bestowed with magical properties, as his journeyman piece to release himself from his apprenticeship as a Smith (and also as a Maker).

The story ends with Alvin and Arthur leaving the town and returning to Alvin's home in the west.

See also

 List of works by Orson Scott Card

References

External links

 About the novel Prentice Alvin from Card's website
 Prentice Alvin at Worlds Without End

1989 American novels
The Tales of Alvin Maker series novels
Alternate history novels
1989 fantasy novels